Patrick Wayne Swayze (August 18, 1952 – September 14, 2009) was an American actor, dancer, and singer known for playing distinctive lead roles, particularly romantic, tough, and comedic characters. He was also known for his media image and looks; People magazine named Swayze the "Sexiest Man Alive" in 1991.

Swayze received three nominations for the Golden Globe Award for Best Lead Actor in a Motion Picture – Comedy or Musical, for his roles in the romance film Dirty Dancing (1987), the thriller film Ghost (1990), and the road comedy film To Wong Foo, Thanks for Everything, Julie Newmar (1995). He also acted in famous action films, such as Road House (1989) and Point Break (1991). He was honored with a star on the Hollywood Walk of Fame in 1997.

Swayze co-wrote and recorded the popular song "She's Like the Wind" and was posthumously awarded the Rolex Dance Award in 2012. In 2009, Swayze died of pancreatic cancer at the age of 57.

Early life
Patrick Wayne Swayze was born on August 18, 1952, in Houston, Texas, the second child of Patsy Swayze (née Karnes; 1927–2013), a dancer, choreographer, and dance instructor, and Jesse Wayne Swayze (1925–1982), an engineering draftsman. He had an older sister, Vickie (1949–1994), two younger brothers, actor Don (born 1958) and Sean (born 1962), and a younger sister, Bambi (born 1966). Swayze's paternal ancestor was Englishman John Swasey (1619–1706) from Bridport in Dorset. During the Puritan migration to New England between 1620 and 1640, Swasey traveled aboard The Recovery, ultimately arriving in the Massachusetts Bay Colony. He married Katherine Kinge from Essex and eventually had seven children. Their grandson Samuel, a judge, was among the first to use the Swayze spelling.

Until age 20, Swayze lived in the Oak Forest neighborhood of Houston, where he attended St. Rose of Lima Catholic School, Oak Forest Elementary School, Black Middle School, Waltrip High School, and San Jacinto College Central. During this time, he pursued multiple artistic and athletic skills, such as ice skating, classical ballet, and acting in school plays. He also played football during high school, hoping to receive a football scholarship for college, until a knee injury ended his career. He concurrently practiced martial arts such as Wushu, Taekwondo, and Aikido, which he used to channel his "self-deprecating rage." In 1972, he moved to New York City to complete his formal dance training at the Harkness Ballet and Joffrey Ballet schools.

Career

1980s 

Patrick Swayze's first professional appearance was as a dancer for the Disney Theatrical Group in a show called Disney on Parade. He then starred in the role of Danny Zuko in one of the replacement casts for the long-running Broadway production of Grease. In 1979, he made his film debut as Ace in Skatetown, U.S.A.. At the height of the popularity of disco, he starred in a Pabst Blue Ribbon commercial of him going on a date at a disco-themed nightclub with Pabst's then-jingle set to disco music. He appeared in the M*A*S*H episode "Blood Brothers" in 1981 as Private Sturgis, whose wounds are minor, but who is found to be terminally ill with cancer. That same year, he appeared in the TV movie Return of the Rebels with Barbara Eden, and then in 1983, had a brief stint on the short-lived TV series The Renegades, playing a gang leader named Bandit.

Swayze became better known to the film industry after appearing in The Outsiders in 1983 as the older brother of C. Thomas Howell and Rob Lowe. In the same year, Swayze played a Marine Corps trainer in Vietnam rescue film Uncommon Valor with Gene Hackman. The following year, Swayze, Howell, and Howell's friend and fellow The Outsiders actor Darren Dalton reunited in Red Dawn, along with Jennifer Grey. In 1986, Lowe and Swayze reunited in Youngblood. Swayze's first major dramatic success was in the 1985 television miniseries North and South, set during the American Civil War.

Swayze starred in 1987's Dirty Dancing, a low-budget movie, planned for only a one-week release, after which it was to go to video. Swayze played resort dance instructor Johnny Castle, alongside his frequent co-star Jennifer Grey. The story enabled Swayze to dance and romance Grey, and showcase his professional dance training. In addition to acting and dancing, Swayze co-composed and sang one of the songs on the soundtrack for Dirty Dancing, "She's Like the Wind." The song became a top-10 hit that has since been covered by other artists. Swayze had originally co-written the song with Stacy Widelitz for the film Grandview, U.S.A. in 1984. Dirty Dancings coming-of-age story first became a surprise hit, and then achieved enormous international success. It was the first film to sell one million copies on video, and as of 2009, it had earned over $214 million worldwide. The film also generated several alternative, or derivative, versions, ranging from a television series to stage productions to a computer game. Swayze received a Golden Globe Award nomination for the role. After Dirty Dancing, Swayze found himself in great demand and appeared in several films, including Road House in 1989 with Sam Elliott, Ben Gazzara, and Kelly Lynch.

1990s 
Swayze next starred as Sam Wheat in the 1990 romance-thriller film Ghost opposite Demi Moore, Whoopi Goldberg, and Tony Goldwyn. Ghost was the highest-grossing film of the year and earned positive reviews from critics. The film was nominated for the Academy Award for Best Picture and Swayze earned another Golden Globe nomination for his acting. It was also Swayze who convinced the producers to hire Goldberg, who thanked Swayze in her acceptance speech when she won the Academy Award for Best Supporting Actress. The scene where he and Moore use a pottery wheel has become an iconic moment. In the following year, he starred alongside Youngblood castmate Keanu Reeves in another major action hit, Point Break, and in 1991 People magazine named him the "Sexiest Man Alive."

For his contributions to the film industry, Swayze was given a star on the Hollywood Walk of Fame in 1997. Swayze was injured in May 1997 while filming HBO's Letters from a Killer near Ione, California, when he fell from a horse and hit a tree. Both of his legs were broken, and he suffered four detached tendons in his shoulder. Filming was suspended for two months. The film aired in 1998, and Swayze slowly recovered from his injuries, but he had trouble resuming his career until 2000, when he co-starred in Forever Lulu, with Melanie Griffith.

In 1995, Swayze appeared in the movie To Wong Foo, Thanks for Everything! Julie Newmar, starring alongside Wesley Snipes and John Leguizamo as three drag queens whose car breaks down on a cross-country trip, leaving them stranded in a small town.

2000s 

In 2001, he appeared in Donnie Darko, where he played a motivational speaker who is revealed to be a closeted pedophile. The film later obtained a cult following. After this, he co-starred with Billy Bob Thornton and Charlize Theron in Waking Up in Reno, which focuses on two redneck couples taking a road trip from Little Rock to Reno to see a monster truck rally. In 2004, he played Allan Quatermain in King Solomon's Mines and had a cameo appearance in the Dirty Dancing prequel Dirty Dancing: Havana Nights as an unnamed dance instructor.

In 2003, Swayze co-produced and also starred in the fictional dance film One Last Dance, along with his real-life wife Lisa Niemi. The story revolves around an actual dance production, Without a Word, which was choreographed by Alonzo King. Swayze and Niemi also produced the film, starred in it, and composed some of the music.

Swayze made his debut in London's West End in the musical Guys and Dolls as Nathan Detroit on July 27, 2006, alongside Neil Jerzak and Jordan McGhee, and remained in the role until November 25, 2006. His previous appearances on the Broadway stage included productions of Goodtime Charley in 1975 and Chicago. Swayze also provided the voice for Cash the country music band dog in The Fox and the Hound 2 (2006), and in 2007 he starred in the film Christmas in Wonderland. Swayze played an aging rock star in Powder Blue (2008), co-starring his younger brother Don in their first film together.

In his final role, Swayze starred as FBI agent Charles Barker in the A&E drama The Beast, which was filmed in Chicago. Swayze was diagnosed with pancreatic cancer shortly after filming the pilot episode, but continued working on the show while receiving treatment. The Beast premiered on January 15, 2009, and ran for one season. Reviewer Alan Sepinwall wrote: "[When] you watch Swayze in The Beast, [you] realize that this is the best performance of his career—that the opportunity to play a part like this, and to play it as well as he is, may be fueling his ability to keep fighting against the cancer. And you realize, in an odd silver lining, that the cancer may, in turn, be fueling the performance."

Personal life

Relationships and mental health 

Swayze was married to Lisa Niemi for 34 years from June 12, 1975, until his death. They had no children, but Lisa had suffered one miscarriage. They met in 1970 when Swayze was 18 years old. Niemi, 14 at the time, was taking dance lessons from Swayze's mother. In a 2008 interview, Swayze stated that Niemi was the inspiration for his song "She's Like the Wind" (1987).

In 1989, Swayze said, "I've always felt there was something different in there (my personality), but I was scared to look. For I fear I wouldn't find anything. That's the reason I got into Soka Gakkai Buddhism, and earlier in life took EST training, was into therapy, into transcendental meditation. I was trying to support that side of myself. But, you know, in Texas, there isn't much support for that part of you. I finally found what I was looking for in the Soka Gakkai tradition of Buddhist practice." Swayze said he loved looking into various belief systems and faiths, how it matters to other people, and how respecting other religious teachings is important to him. 

Swayze publicly recounted his ten-year battle with alcoholism after his father's death. He entered rehabilitation in the 1990s, and after recovery, Swayze temporarily withdrew from show business, staying on his ranches in California and Las Vegas, New Mexico, to breed Arabian horses. His best-known horse was Tammen, a chestnut Arabian stallion.

Swayze, who was an FAA-licensed pilot with an instrument rating, made the news on June 1, 2000, while flying with his dogs in his twin-engined Cessna 414 N414PS, from Van Nuys, California, to Las Vegas, New Mexico. His plane developed a pressurization problem, causing Swayze to make a precautionary landing on a dirt road in a housing complex in Prescott Valley, Arizona. The plane's right wing struck a light pole, but Swayze was unharmed. According to the police report, witnesses said that Swayze appeared to be extremely intoxicated and asked for help to remove evidence from the crash site, namely an open bottle of wine and a 30-pack of beer. He made himself unavailable to police for several hours. It was later determined that the alcohol in question was not in the cabin, but stored in external storage compartments inaccessible in flight, and the probable cause of the accident was Swayze's physical impairment due to the cumulative effects of carbon monoxide from engine exhaust byproducts, carbon monoxide from heavy tobacco use, and the loss of an undetermined amount of cabin pressurization, resulting in hypoxia.

On December 27, 2006, Swayze and Niemi, who was also a licensed pilot, experienced a second incident while flying N414PS together en route to their New Mexico ranch. During the climb from their origin airport, they experienced a loss of power followed by a total failure of their right engine. Niemi, who was in the pilot's seat for the flight, successfully landed the plane in Van Nuys. After this second incident, the couple decided to sell it in favor of a Beechcraft Super King Air, N400KW, which they purchased through their company Prop Jocks Inc. in June 2007.

Illness and death 
In late December 2007, just after filming the pilot episode for The Beast, Swayze began to suffer a burning feeling in his stomach caused by a blockage of his bile ducts. Three weeks later, in mid-January 2008, he was diagnosed with stage IV pancreatic cancer. He traveled to the Stanford University Medical Center for chemotherapy and treatment with the experimental drug vatalanib, which doctors hoped would cut off the blood supply to the tumor.

On March 5, 2008, a Reuters article reported that Swayze "has a very limited amount of disease, and he appears to be responding well to treatment thus far." Swayze's doctor confirmed that the actor was diagnosed with pancreatic cancer but insisted he was not as close to death as reports suggested. Despite repeated tabloid claims that his death was imminent, Swayze continued to actively pursue his career.

In early May 2008, a number of tabloids reported that Swayze underwent surgery to remove part of his stomach after the cancer spread. Reports also stated that he rewrote his will, transferring his property to his wife. In a statement made on May 28, Swayze said he continued to respond well to treatment at Stanford University Medical Center. In late May 2008, he was seen at a Los Angeles Lakers basketball game, his first public appearance since his diagnosis. In June 2008, he reportedly said, "My treatments are working and I am winning the battle."

Swayze appeared on the ABC, NBC, and CBS simulcast of Stand Up to Cancer in September 2008 to appeal to the general public for donations for the initiative. Swayze said to a standing ovation, "I dream that the word 'cure' will no longer be followed by the words 'it's impossible.' Together, we can make a world where cancer no longer means living with fear, without hope, or worse." After the show ended, Swayze remained onstage and talked to other cancer patients; executive producer Laura Ziskin (herself battling advanced breast cancer, which claimed her own life) said, "He said a beautiful thing: 'I'm just an individual living with cancer.' That's how he wants to be thought of. He's in a fight, but he's a fighter." On December 2, 2008, Swayze denied claims made by tabloids that the cancer had spread to his liver.

In an interview with Barbara Walters, which aired in January 2009, Swayze admitted that he had "a tiny little mass" in his liver, but told Walters that he wanted the media to report that he was "kicking it." When Walters asked him if he was using any holistic or alternative methods of treatment besides chemotherapy, Swayze said he was using some Chinese herbs. He then voiced his opposition to the unsupported claims made by proponents of alternative therapies.

On January 9, 2009, Swayze was hospitalized with pneumonia, which was said to be a complication of chemotherapy for his cancer. On January 16, he was released from the hospital to rest at home with his wife. On April 19, 2009, doctors informed Swayze that the cancer had again metastasized to his liver. Swayze was a smoker for 40 years, and he once made reference to smoking 60 cigarettes a day. He stated that his chain smoking probably "had something to do with" the development of his disease, and continued to smoke cigarettes while undergoing treatment for cancer.

Swayze died with family at his side on September 14, 2009, at the age of 57. Swayze's death occurred 20 months after his cancer diagnosis. Swayze's publicist confirmed to CNN that he had died of pancreatic cancer. His body was cremated and his ashes were scattered over his New Mexico ranch.

Filmography

Film

Television

Discography

Soundtrack appearances
{| class="wikitable" style="font-size: 100%;"
|-
! scope="col" | Year
! scope="col" | Title
! scope="col" | Artist(s)
! scope="col" class="unsortable" | Album
|-
|1987
|"She's Like the Wind"
|Patrick Swayze, Wendy Fraser
|Dirty Dancing
|-
|rowspan=3|1989
|"Raising Heaven (in Hell) Tonight"
| rowspan="2" |Patrick Swayze
|rowspan=2|Road House
|-
|"Cliff's Edge"
|-
|"Brothers"
|Patrick Swayze, Larry Gatlin
|Next of Kin|-
|rowspan=2|2003
|"When You Dance"
|Patrick Swayze, Lisa Niemi
|rowspan=2| One Last Dance|-
|"Finding My Way Back"
|Patrick Swayze
|}

 Awards and nominations 
Swayze received multiple awards and nominations throughout his career for his work both film and television. During his film career he received three Golden Globe award nominations for Best Lead Actor in a Motion Picture – Comedy or Musical for his roles in Dirty Dancing, Ghost and To Wong Foo Thanks for Everything!, Julie Newmar. In 1996, he was immortalized when Swayze received his star of the Hollywood Walk of Fame for his contribution to Motion Picture, located at 7018 Hollywood, Blvd.

 See also 
Sexiest Man Alive

 References 

External links

 
 
 Remembering Patrick Swayze – slideshow by LIFE'' magazine

1952 births
2009 deaths
20th-century American male actors
20th-century American singers
21st-century American male actors
American aikidoka
American male dancers
American male film actors
American male musical theatre actors
American male singers
American male taekwondo practitioners
American male television actors
American male voice actors
American people of English descent
American wushu practitioners
Burials in New Mexico
Dancers from Texas
Deaths from cancer in California
Deaths from pancreatic cancer
Male actors from Houston
Male actors from New Mexico
Male actors from Texas
Musicians from Houston
People from Las Vegas, New Mexico
San Jacinto College alumni
Singers from New Mexico
Singers from Texas